This is a list of cricketers who played first-class cricket in England in matches between the 1841 and 1850 seasons. The sport of cricket had acquired most of its modern features by this time and roundarm bowling was firmly established.

More county cricket clubs began to become established during this period, following the establishment of Sussex County Cricket Club in 1839. Clubs were formally established in Nottinghamshire, Kent and Surrey, all of which remain first-class counties today. These teams competed against each other and other teams, although the County Championship was not formally established until 1890.

The players included are those known to have played in matches which were given retrospective first-class status between 1841 and 1850 inclusive.

A

B

C

D

E

F

G

H

I

J

K

L

M

N

O

P

R

S

T

U

V

W

Y

See also
 List of English cricketers (1772–1786)
 List of English cricketers (1787–1825)
 List of English cricketers (1826–1840)
 List of English cricketers (1851–1860)
 List of English cricketers (1861–1870)

Notes

References
Note that CricketArchive is a subscription only website.

Bibliography
Carlaw D (2020) Kent County Cricketers A to Z. Part One: 1806–1914 (revised edition). (Available online at the Association of Cricket Statisticians and Historians. Retrieved 2020-12-21.)</ref>
 
 

English cricketers 1841